The Venta de Baños–Gijón railway is a Spanish railway linking Gijón, Asturias to the rest of the mainline Spanish rail network.

Route
The line branches from the Madrid–Hendaye railway at Venta de Baños, and serves Palencia, León and Oviedo before reaching Gijón. At León, the León–A Coruña railway starts.

Services
The Cercanías Asturias commuter rail service operates to Puente de los Fierres from Gijón; and a Renfe Regional service runs the full length of the line from Gijón to Valladolid-Campo Grande, taking 5 hours and 43 minutes.

Future
The line is to be extended from its current Gijón terminus further into the city to Cabueñes via a tunnel with underground stations. This project, known as Metrotrén Asturias, stalled in 2006, but is due to resume in 2019 and conclude in 2023.

References

Railway lines in Spain
Railway lines opened in 1884
Iberian gauge railways